The 2005–06 season was the 105th season in Stade Rennais F.C.'s history. The club participated in the Ligue 1, the Coupe de France, Coupe de la Ligue and UEFA Cup. The season began on 30 July 2005 and concluded on 13 May 2006.

Competitions

Overall record

Ligue 1

League table

Results summary

Results by round

Matches 

Source:

Coupe de France

Coupe de la Ligue

UEFA Cup

First round

Group stage

Statistics

Appearances and goals

|-
! colspan="12" style="background:#dcdcdc; text-align:center"| Goalkeepers

|-
! colspan="12" style="background:#dcdcdc; text-align:center"| Defenders

|-
! colspan="12" style="background:#dcdcdc; text-align:center"| Midfielders

|-
! colspan="12" style="background:#dcdcdc; text-align:center"| Forwards

|-

References

External links

Stade Rennais F.C. seasons
Rennes